The Association of Directory Publishers (ADP) is the voice of print and online directory publishers that empowers its members to succeed in today’s fast moving marketing environment. ADP is the only international trade association that serves directory publishers for the pursuit of collaborating, networking, and sharing best practices focusing on the challenges and opportunities in our ever-evolving industry.

About
The Association of Directory Publishers (ADP) is the voice of print and online directory publishers that empowers its members to succeed in today’s fast moving marketing environment. ADP is the only international trade association that serves directory publishers for the pursuit of collaborating, networking, and sharing best practices focusing on the challenges and opportunities in our ever-evolving industry. ADP is dedicated to its members and partner organizations to advance the industry’s advocacy, research, combine resources and hold networking events to enhance their ability to successfully connect their directories’ sellers to buyers.

The Association helps its members expand their businesses by offering them services and tools targeted to assisting them in achieving their clients' advertising objectives. ADP offers a wide variety of research, marketing and sales materials created with information from leading organization that are developed specifically to help members increase their company's bottom line.

ADP is a unique Association because of the governance structure of one company, one vote.  Every publisher from the smallest to the largest has an equal opportunity to determine the leadership and direction of the Association.  ADP represents member companies of all sizes and from numerous countries.

History
The group formed in 1898 as the Association of American Directory Publishers, headquartered in New York. It aimed "to improve the directory business." It changed its name to the Association of North American Directory Publishers in 1919. It has held annual meetings starting in 1899 and has published the Directory Bulletin. Officers have included George W. Overton and Ralph Lane Polk. Among the members in the 1920s:

 Action Pages
 Atkinson Erie Directory Company
 Atlanta City Directory Company
 W.H. Boyd Company
 Burch Directory Company
 Caron Directory Company
 Chicago Directory Company
 J.W. Clement Company
 Cleveland Directory Company
 Connelly Directory Company
 Fitzgerald Directory Company
 Gate City Directory Company
 Hartford Printing Company
 Henderson Directories Ltd.
 Hill Directory Company
 C.E. Howe Company
 Kimball Directory Company
 Leshnick Directory Company
 Los Angeles Directory Company
 John Lovell & Son Ltd.
 McCoy Directory Company
 H.A. Manning Company
 Maritime Directory Company
 Henry M. Meek Publishing Company
 Might Directories Ltd.
 Minneapolis Directory Company
 Piedmont Directory Company
 R.L. Polk & Company
 Polk-Gould Directory Company
 Polk-Husted Directory Company
 Polk-McAvoy Directory Company
 Polk's Southern Directory Company
 Portland Directory Company
 Price & Lee Company
 W.L. Richmond
 Roberts Bros Company
 Sampson & Murdock Company
 Soards Directory Company 
 Utica Directory Publishing Company
 Williams Directory Company
 John F. Worley Directory Company
 Wright Directory Company

In 1992 the group renamed itself the "Association of Directory Publishers."

References

Further reading

External links
 Official website
 

Organizations established in 1898
1898 establishments in the United States
Professional associations based in the United States
Publishing organizations
Directories
Yellow pages